Moonwalk, officially Barangay Moonwalk, is one of Parañaque's 16 barangays and is part of Parañaque's 2nd district. It was created under Presidential Decree No. 1321 signed in by President Ferdinand Marcos on April 3, 1978, From the latest population census of The Philippines (2015) Moonwalk has a population of 67,723.

Moonwalk is a residential place and has seen commercial growth with 2,120 business establishments and its total road network is believed to be around 38.1 km.

Many of the streets of Moonwalk Phase 1 and 2 are named after astronauts and other important figures of the NASA Mercury, Gemini and Apollo programs and the space race, such as Alan Shepard, John Glenn, Gus Grissom, Michael Collins, Buzz Aldrin and Neil Armstrong, as well as German rocket pioneer Wernher von Braun and Russian cosmonaut Yuri Gagarin.

Historical Background 
Barangay Moonwalk was previously a contiguous area of subdivisions that formed part of Barangay Santo Niño, until it was separated and given its own identity by virtue of Presidential Decree No. 1321 signed by then-President Ferdinand Marcos on April 13, 1978. The subdivisions mentioned therein include Moonwalk Phase 1 and 2, Bricktown Phase 1, 2 and 3, and Multinational Village.

Based on Section 3 of said Presidential Decree, the first set of barangay officials of Barangay Moonwalk were the same elective barangay officials of Barangay Santo Niño who continued to perform their duties as such in the newly created barangay until a new set of officials for have been appointed by the President. These new set of appointed barangay officials were to hold office until their successors were elected in the regular barangay elections following the issuance of the said Decree, and were qualified, unless sooner removed at the pleasure of the President. The other officials and employees of the newly created Barangay were likewise appointed as necessary to organize or complete the government personnel of Barangay Moonwalk.

The proportionate share of Barangay Moonwalk in the obligations, funds, assets and other property of Barangay Santo Niño were transferred by the President to the newly created Barangay Moonwalk upon the recommendation of the Commission on Audit.

Physical Information 
Barangay Moonwalk's total land area is about 401.01 hectares bounded on the northeast by Barangay Merville, to the east by Barangay Don Bosco, to the southeast by Barangay San Isidro and southwestt by Barangay San Dionisio, and to the northwest by Barangay Sto.Niño.

Boundary: 

 North: C-5 Extension / Libjo Bridge
 South: Saint Jude Multinational Creek
 East: Chateau Elysee
 West: Riverside Multinational

Its major roads are Armstrong Avenue, E. Rodriguez Avenue and Fastrack, while the secondary roads include Saint Francis St., Daang Batang and Multinational Avenue. The mode of public transportation inside the barangay include jeepney, taxi, and tricycle.

There are a total of nine accredited Tricycle Operator and Driver Associations (TODAs) plying inside the barangay, as follows:

 Brictown TODA (BRICKTODA)
 Residence of Moonwalk Village TODA (ROMVITODA) formerly ROMTSAI
 Bliss Multinational Village TODA (BMVTODA)
 Moonwalk Multinational Village TODA (MMVTODA)
 Rodriguez Moonwalk TODA (RODMOTODA)
 Barangay Moonwalk TODA (BARMOTODA)
 Fastrack Moonwalk TODA (FAMOTODA)
 Villanueva Multinational TODA (VMTODA)
 San Agustin Village Tricycle Service Association, Inc. (SAVTSAI)

Barangay Moonwalk has seven puroks, five sitios, five major areas / subdivisions, namely Moonwalk Phase 1 (PHIMRA), Moonwalk Phase 2 (ROMVI), Moonwalk Phase 3, Multinational Village and San Agustin Village, consisting of twenty eight (28) satellite village associations, thirty four (34) neighborhood homeowner's associations, thirty seven (37) neighborhood mission areas, and three condominium associations.

Of the above-mentioned areas, twenty-two (22) can be considered fire-prone areas and these include Kenko and Libjo in Phase 1, Velarde, Sitio Haise 1, Haise Glenn & Cooper in Phase 2, Sitio Sunrise, Sitio Bukid and ERENA in Phase 3, Airport Village, Areas A, B, and C in Purok 1, Manggahan Purok 2 in Purok 2, San Agustin Dulo in Purok 3, Saint Paul, Scarlet Ibaba, Kawayanan E. Rodriguez in Purok 4, United Cairo Tel-Aviv in Purok 6, Riverside, Galatia, Morales, and Manggahan Purok 7 in Purok 7.

Flood-prone areas, on the other hand include Aldrin, J. Young and Grissom Streets as well as Kenko and Libjo in Phase 1, Christina Village, Sitio Haise 1, Haise Glenn & Cooper in Phase 2, Sitio Sunrise, Sitio Bukid, ERENA and MRC in Phase 3, Area B and the stretch of Fastrack Road in Purok 1, Kawayanan Fastrack, Daang Batang Rd, Saint Paul, Scarlet Ibaba and Kawayanan E. Rodriguez in Purok 4 and almost all areas in Purok 7.

Barangay Moonwalk has one park, the Andrew's Park in Multinational Avenue, one Korean Church along Galatia St. in Multinational Avenue, one church of the Latter Saints along Fastrack Avenue in Purok 1, and three Catholic churches / parishes, namely:

 Holy Eucharist Parish in Moonwalk Phase 1
 San Agustin Parish in San Agustin Village
 Our Lady of the Most Holy Rosary in Multinational Village

The Barangay has a total of ten daycare centers with eleven daycare workers catering to roughly 850 indigent children aged 4-5 years old:

 Phase 1 Day Care Center, Armstrong Ave, Phase 1
 Airborneville Day Care Center, Armstrong Avenue (formerly at RSG)
 Velarde Compound Day Care Center, Velarde Compound, Phase 2
 Airport Village Day Care Center, Fastrack, Purok 1
 San Agustin Day Care Center, Saint Francis Street, San Agustin Village, Purok 3
 Tel-Aviv Day Care Center, Cairo St., Multinational Purok 6
 S.M.G.I Day Care Center, Gulayan, Multinational Phase 4
 Manggahan Day Care Center, Multinational Purok 7
 SAMAPA Day Care Center, Timothy St., Multinational Village

Barangay Moonwalk has two public elementary schools, namely: San Agustin Elementary School along E. Rodriguez St., San Agustin Village and Col. E. De Leon Elementary School along Multinational Avenue, Multinational Village, and one public secondary school, the Moonwalk National High School along Daang Batang St., San Agustin Village.

On the other hand, there are eleven other pre-school / learning centers:

 Abenton Learning Center, E. Rodriguez Ave., Purok 4
 Animo Kids Learning Center, Calle Rosa, Moonwalk Phase 2
 Bricktown Learning Center, Bricktown Moonwalk Phase 3
 Bright Computer Learning Center, RSG Townhomes
 Connecting Horizon Learning Center, Sto.Niño, Purok 4
 D'Archangels ARC Academy, Sagana Village, Purok 2
 Global Christian Academy, Capernaum, Multinational Village
 Kids Town Learning Center, Multinational Village
 Richfield Child Development Center, Multinational Ave., Purok 7
 White Play Learning Center, Benrosi Plaza, Fastrack, Purok 1
 Whiz Kids Home-based Learning Center, Multinational Ave, Purok 7

In terms of private schools, Sacred Heart School in Madre Isabela de Rossi St. in Multinational Avenue has pre-school, elementary and secondary education offerings while Arandia College in Airport Village is the only private educational institution offering pre-school, up to college education. Other private schools offering booth pre-school and elementary education:

 Blessed Aldeheid Academy, Daang Batang, Purok 4
 Madre Maria Pia Notary School, Timothy St., Multinational Village
 Philippians Academy, Haise St., Moonwalk Phase 2
 Parañaque Risen Christ School, Saint Francis St., San Agustin Village
 Pean Integrated School of Parañaque, Aldrin St., Moonwalk Phase 1
 St. Hannibal Multi-level School, Multinational Avenue

Political Information 
As of 2015, Barangay Moonwalk has a total of 24,783 registered voters aged 18 years old and above. It also has five voting precincts located at:

 Col. E De Leon Elementary School (CEDLES), Multinational Village
 Moonwalk Phase 1 (PHIMRA) Gym, Moonwalk Phase 1
 Moonwalk Phase 2 (ROMVI) Gym, Moonwalk Phase 2
 Multinational Clubhouse, Multinational Village
 San Agustin Elementary School (SAES), San Agustin Village

Government 
The barangay government of Moonwalk is led by its barangay chairman, Roberto C. Alano. And the members of barangay council are Carlito "Doods" S. Antipuesto Jr., Niño A. Castroverde, Ramoncito "Rex" V. Cruz, Dante B. Ramos, Antonio "Tony" O. Pagsisihan, Eduarda "Edith" R. Advincula, Milagros "Mila" D. Rodriguez and the Sangguniang Kabataan chairman Jonas Dennis A. Punay.

Population 
Once every 5 years on May 1, The Philippine Statistics Authority does a population census on the Philippines, except in 1985 and in 2005.

References

Barangays of Metro Manila
Parañaque
Gated communities in the Philippines
1978 establishments in the Philippines